Dharampur assembly constituency is one of the 182 assembly constituencies of Gujarat. It is located in Valsad district. This seat is reserved for members of Scheduled Tribes.

List of segments

This assembly seat represents the following segments,

 Dharampur Taluka
 Valsad Taluka (Part) Villages – Gorgam, Panchlai, Bhanji Falia, Sonwada, Tighara, Dhanori, Endergota, Khajurdi, Palan, Fanaswada, Atgam, Segva, Muli, Ovada, Kochwada, Kalwada, Pitha, Marala, Sarangpur, Kanjan Ranchhod, Thakkarwada, Kanjan Hari, Gadaria, Kaparia, Dulsad, Bhutsar, Ronvel, Bhoma Pardi, Anjlav, Rabada, Navera, Bodlai, Valandi, Vankal, Ozar, Kachigam, Kakadmati, Faldhara, Kosamkuwa, Velvach, Chinchai

Members of Legislative Assembly

Election results

2022

2017

2012

See also
 List of constituencies of the Gujarat Legislative Assembly
 Valsad district

References

External links
 

Assembly constituencies of Gujarat
Valsad district